New Eltham railway station is in the Royal Borough of Greenwich in south-east London.

It is operated by Southeastern and is in Travelcard Zone 4.  It has two platforms: Platform 1 the "up" platform for services to London and Platform 2 the "down" platform, for services towards Kent.

History

New Eltham station was opened as Pope Street Station in April 1878, twelve years after the opening of the Dartford Loop Line.  The station was renamed New Eltham in 1886 although Pope Street was retained as a suffix until 1927.  It had a goods yard on the up side which closed in 1963 and eventually became a car park, and a signal box just beyond the western end of the down platform.  In 1955 the platforms were extended to take ten carriage trains. In the same year the signal box was taken out of use and demolished.  The up side booking office was rebuilt in 1988.

Location
The station is located in New Eltham in a shallow cutting near the crossroads of Footscray Road and Avery Hill Road.

Connections
London Buses route 160, 162, 233, 314, 321 and B13 serve the station.

Facilities 

The station has been added to the Department for Transport "Access for All" scheme. The footbridge linking the two platforms was removed in the summer of 2013 and replaced with a new accessible footbridge with lifts which became operational in December 2014. Both platforms are accessible without using steps.

Services 

The typical off-peak service in trains per hour is:

The station is also served by a single peak hour return service between Dartford and London Blackfriars.

References

External links 

Railway stations in the Royal Borough of Greenwich
Former South Eastern Railway (UK) stations
Railway stations in Great Britain opened in 1878
Railway stations served by Southeastern